Chris Snell (born May 12, 1971) is a Canadian former professional ice hockey defenceman and an amateur scout (Ontario Hockey League) of the Winnipeg Jets.  He was drafted in the seventh round, 145th overall, by the Buffalo Sabres in the 1991 NHL Entry Draft.

Playing career
As a youth, he played in the 1984 Quebec International Pee-Wee Hockey Tournament with a minor ice hockey team from Oshawa.

Snell played in the Oshawa Kiwanis Minor Hockey program in the OMHA and was a member of the 1987–88 All-Ontario Midget Championship team.

He was drafted in the 4th round (57th overall) in the 1988 OHL Priority Selection by the Ottawa 67's where he played for legendary coach Brian Kilrea.

He was a member of the Team Canada Under-20 1990 World Junior Championship team that captured a gold medal in 1991.

He played in thirty-four games in the National Hockey League: two with the Toronto Maple Leafs in 1993–94 and thirty-two with the Los Angeles Kings in 1994–95. During the 1994–95 season, he was the only defenceman to score two shorthanded goals.

He finished his playing career spending six seasons in the DEL (Deutsche Eishockey Liga) in Germany from 1997–2003.  He retired from active playing in the summer of 2003.

Career statistics

Regular season and playoffs

International

References

External links
 

1971 births
Binghamton Rangers players
Buffalo Sabres draft picks
Canadian ice hockey defencemen
Frankfurt Lions players
Hannover Scorpions players
Ice hockey people from Saskatchewan
Indianapolis Ice players
Los Angeles Kings players
Living people
Ottawa 67's players
Phoenix Roadrunners (IHL) players
Rochester Americans players
St. John's Maple Leafs players
Sportspeople from Regina, Saskatchewan
Tampa Bay Lightning scouts
Toronto Maple Leafs players
Winnipeg Jets scouts
Canadian expatriate ice hockey players in Germany